The KTO Ryś (KTO for Kołowy Transporter Opancerzony - lit. Wheeled Armored Vehicle; Ryś is Polish for Lynx) is 8x8 multi-role military vehicle produced by Wojskowe Zakłady Motoryzacyjne S.A. (formerly WZM No. 5), a Polish Armaments Group company. The vehicle was developed from the chassis and drive train of the OT-64 SKOT armored personnel carrier.

Variants

KTO Ryś-Med

Armored ambulance vehicle with crew of 3, capable to transport maximum of 4 injured in stretched position. This variant was adopted by Polish land Forces and fielded in Iraq and Afghanistan.

KTO Azalia
(Azalia is Polish for Azalea) - artillery command vehicle designed for Krab howitzers units.

ZSRZ Kaktus

(ZSRZ for Zautomatyzowany System Rozpoznawczo-zakłócający - lit. Automatic Reconnaissance-Jamming System; Kaktus is Polish for Cactus) - electronic warfare system based on KTO Ryś.

KTRI Tuja
(KTRI for Kołowy Transporter Rozpoznania Inżynieryjnego - lit. Wheeled Engineering Reconnaissance Vehicle; Tuja is Polish for Thuja) - wheeled engineering vehicle.

KTO Irbis
Irbis is a 6x6 variant of Ryś armored personnel carrier.

Other
At early stages of development Ryś was presented in many variants like APCs and IFV with Reihmal E8 or Rafael RCWS-127 turrets, M98 mortar carrier and other. All those vehicles were based on early first generation of Ryś vehicles, much closer to original OT-64 SKOT, none of those vehicles were adopted, and the manufacturer no longer offers them.

References

External links

 KTO Ryś on WZM official webpage

Wheeled armoured personnel carriers
Armoured fighting vehicles of Poland
Science and technology in Poland
Eight-wheeled vehicles
Armoured personnel carriers of Poland
Armoured personnel carriers of the post–Cold War period
Wheeled amphibious armoured fighting vehicles